The 1981 NCAA Division I baseball season, play of college baseball in the United States organized by the National Collegiate Athletic Association (NCAA) began in the spring of 1981.  The season progressed through the regular season and concluded with the 1981 College World Series.  The College World Series, held for the thirty fifth time in 1981, consisted of one team from each of eight regional competitions and was held in Omaha, Nebraska at Johnny Rosenblatt Stadium as a double-elimination tournament.  Arizona State claimed the championship for the fifth time.

Conference winners
This is a partial list of conference champions from the 1981 season.  The NCAA sponsored regional competitions to determine the College World Series participants.  Seven regionals of four teams and one of six each competed in double-elimination tournaments, with the winners advancing to Omaha.  21 teams earned automatic bids by winning their conference championship while 13 teams earned at-large selections.

Conference standings
The following is an incomplete list of conference standings:

College World Series

The 1981 season marked the thirty fifth NCAA Baseball Tournament, which culminated with the eight team College World Series.  The College World Series was held in Omaha, Nebraska.  The eight teams played a double-elimination format, with Arizona State claiming their fifth championship with a 7–4 win over Oklahoma State in the final.

Award winners

All-America team

References